The Last Nine Days of the Bismarck (Little Brown, 1959), also published as Hunting the Bismark (Michael Joseph, 1959), was written by C.S. Forester (1899–1966), the author of the popular Horatio Hornblower series of naval-themed books. Closely based on the actual naval battle, the book is a novel with fictionalized dialogue and incidents.

The Last Nine Days of the Bismarck tells the story of the breakout of the German battleship Bismarck into the Atlantic as a major threat to the convoys that sustained Britain in the early days of World War II and the Royal Navy's desperate pursuit and destruction of the Bismarck. Sink the Bismarck!, a movie based on Forester's book, was released by Twentieth Century-Fox in 1960, with the book reprinted in paperback under the title Sink the Bismarck! (Bantam, 1959) as a promotional tie-in.

Reception
Kirkus Reviews called the book "a thrilling tale of a running battle at sea."

References

External links
 

1959 British novels
British novels adapted into films
German battleship Bismarck
Michael Joseph books
Novels by C. S. Forester
Novels set in the 1940s
Novels set during World War II
Fiction set in 1941